Gideon Barstow (September 7, 1783 – March 26, 1852) was a U.S. Representative from Massachusetts.  Born in Mattapoisett, Massachusetts, Barstow attended the common schools and Brown University, Providence, Rhode Island from 1799 to 1801.  He studied medicine,  was admitted to practice and settled in Salem, Massachusetts.  He served as member of the State constitutional convention in 1820.

Barstow was elected as a Democratic-Republican to the Seventeenth Congress (March 4, 1821 – March 3, 1823), but was not a candidate for renomination in 1822.
He served as member of the Massachusetts House of Representatives, and served in the Massachusetts State Senate.  He served as presidential elector on the Whig ticket of Clay and Sergeant in 1832.  He moved to St. Augustine, Florida, because of ill health and engaged in mercantile pursuits.  Barstow died in St. Augustine March 26, 1852 and was interred in Huguenot Cemetery.

References

1783 births
1852 deaths
Members of the Massachusetts House of Representatives
Massachusetts state senators
Massachusetts Whigs
Democratic-Republican Party members of the United States House of Representatives from Massachusetts
1832 United States presidential electors
19th-century American politicians
People from Mattapoisett, Massachusetts
Brown University alumni